The Antonov An-3 is a Soviet (later Ukrainian and Russian) civil multipurpose and agricultural aircraft. It is essentially a turboprop-powered development of the An-2, designed to upgrade or replace it. The basic transport version (An-3T) is supplemented by a cargo/passenger version (An-3TK), an agricultural version (An-3SH), a forest fire-fighting version (An-3P), as well as an ambulance version.

Upgrading 

The upgrading consisted of replacement of the piston engine with a  TVD-20 turboprop engine, featuring a three-blade reversible pitch (type AV-17) propeller and a R-17 speed governor. The flight compartment was rearranged; a heating and ventilation system was installed as well as advanced electric and flight and navigation equipment; centralized warning system; a new fire extinguishing system; and an improvement of the external wide-spreading dispensing equipment for agricultural needs. The upgrades allowed the aircraft to be more reliable and to increase the cargo lifting capacity of the aircraft by 20%, as well as ensuring more comfortable conditions for the crew, including the lowering of the noise and vibration inside the cockpit. The rate of climb was increased by 1.9 times, and the take-off and landing performance of the aircraft was increased. The upgrading allowed the use of kerosene and lubricants commonly used for other aircraft instead of gasoline. The upgrading was arranged at both the "Polyot" Production Association in Omsk, Russian Federation, and at Antonov ASTC, Kiev, Ukraine.

The first example flew as early as May 13, 1980, but because of a lack of official interest in the project, work proceeded very slowly. Flight testing was not complete until 1991. It is one of the few turbine-powered biplane designs to date. The An-3T received its Type Certificate on 31 August 2000. Supplements to the Type Certificate included version with ski landing gear and an agricultural version.

Versions 

The project was revitalised in the late 1990s when it was taken over by Polyot State Aerospace Enterprise, and a marketing campaign began in earnest in 2000, although sales have been limited.

Although it is designated An-3, this number is not assigned sequentially. Antonov assigned it to the plane because it was meant to replace the An-2.

Another attempt to replace the An-2 on Soviet farms was made in the 1970s with the WSK-Mielec M-15 Belphegor, but it failed.

From 2007, the "Polyot" Production Association started to upgrade the first ten An-2s of the Russian Airborne Troops to An-3T-10 standard. The overall requirement is estimated at approximately 200 aircraft.

Specifications (An-3T)

See also

References 

  (Shortened version in English available here)

External links 

 
 Panorama of an AN-3T stranded at the South Pole

An-003
Single-engined tractor aircraft
Biplanes
1980s Soviet civil utility aircraft
Soviet and Russian agricultural aircraft
Single-engined turboprop aircraft
Aircraft first flown in 1980